Kuybagh or Kuiyibage was a county-controlled district in Zepu County, Xinjiang Uyghur Autonomous Region, China. In 2014, Kuybagh District was abolished and split into Kuybagh Town and Kuybagh Township.

References 

Former districts of China
Kashgar Prefecture
Township-level divisions of Xinjiang